Notogibbula lehmanni, common name the many-coloured top shell, is a species of small sea snail, a marine gastropod mollusc in the family Trochidae, the top shells.

The fossil record of this species goes back to the Early Pleistocene.

Description
The size of the shell varies between 6 mm and 9 mm. The umbilicate shell is rather thin and has an orbicular-conoid shape. The six whorls are separated by impressed sutures.  The first whorl is eroded, the following are angular, flattened above, gradate, strikingly painted, spirally lirate. The delicate lirae number about 12 on the penultimate whorl. The body whorl is dilated, biangular, ornamented with transverse white and reddish-violet interrupted lines, like flexuous rays. At the suture and periphery, there are zones formed of violet-brown spots alternating with white or yellowish ones. The base of the shell is convex, with 15 to 16 concentric lirae. The coloration is white and reddish tessellated. The aperture subovate and has thin margins. The columella is arcuate, subnodose inside below. The white umbilical tract is funnel-shaped.

Distribution
This marine species is endemic to Australia and occurs off New South Wales, South Australia, Tasmania, Victoria and Western Australia

References

 Menke, C.T. 1843. Molluscorum Novae Hollandiae Specimen in Libraria Aulica Hahniana. Hannoverae : Libraria Aulica Hahniana pp. 1–46.
 Philippi, R.A. 1851. Trochidae. pp. 137–232 in Küster, H.C. (ed). Systematisches Conchylien-Cabinet von Martini und Chemnitz. Nürnberg : Bauer & Raspe Vol. II.
 Adams, A. 1853. Contributions towards a monograph of the Trochidae, a family of gastropodous Mollusca. Proceedings of the Zoological Society of London 1851(19): 150-192
 Adams, A. 1855. Further contribution towards the Natural History of the Trochidae; with a description of a new genus, and of several new species, from the Cumingian Collection. Proceedings of the Zoological Society of London 1854(22): 37-41, pl. 27
 Fischer, P. 1879. Genres Calcar, Trochus, Xenophora, Tectarius et Risella. 337-463, 120 pls in Keiner, L.C. (ed.). Spécies general et iconographie des coquilles vivantes. Paris : J.B. Baillière Vol. 3.
 Verco, J.C. 1905. Notes on South Australian marine Mollusca with descriptions of new species. Part II. Transactions of the Royal Society of South Australia 29: 166-172
 Cotton, B.C. 1959. South Australian Mollusca. Archaeogastropoda. Handbook of the Flora and Fauna of South Australia. Adelaide : South Australian Government Printer 449 pp.
 Ludbrook, N.H. 1978. Quaternary molluscs of the western part of the Eucla Basin. Bulletin of the Geological Survey of Western Australia 125: 1-286
 Wilson, B. 1993. Australian Marine Shells. Prosobranch Gastropods. Kallaroo, Western Australia : Odyssey Publishing Vol. 1 408 pp

External links
 

lehmanni
Gastropods of Australia
Gastropods described in 1843